The Imperial Army of the Russian Empire fielded numerous cavalry regiments from the Don Cossack Host until the abdication of Emperor Nicholas II in 1917, at which point many fought in the Russian Civil War and were finally disbanded after the fall of the White movement to the Bolsheviks.

World War I
1st Don Cossack Generalissimo Duke Suvorov Regiment
2nd Don Cossack His Imperial Majesty the Tsarevich's Regiment
3rd Don Cossack Yermak Timofeyevich Regiment
4th Don Cossack Count Platov Regiment
5th Don Cossack Host Ataman Vlasov Regiment
6th Don Cossack General Krasnoshchyokov Regiment
7th Don Cossack Host Ataman Denisov Regiment
8th Don Cossack General Ilovaysky XII Regiment
9th Don Cossack Adjutant-General Count Orlov-Denisov Regiment
10th Don Cossack General Lukovin Regiment
11th Don Cossack General of Cavalry Count Denisov Regiment
12th Don Cossack General Field Marshal Duke Potemkin-Tvarichesky Regiment
13th Don Cossack General Field Marshal Duke Kutuzov Smolensky Regiment
14th Don Cossack Host Ataman Yefremov Regiment
15th Don Cossack General Krasnov I Regiment
16th Don Cossack General Grekov VIII Regiment
17th Don Cossack General Baklanov Regiment
18th Don Cossack Regiment
19th Don Cossack Regiment
20th Don Cossack Regiment
21st Don Cossack Regiment
22nd Don Cossack Regiment
23rd Don Cossack Regiment
24th Don Cossack Regiment
25th Don Cossack Regiment
26th Don Cossack Regiment
27th Don Cossack Regiment
28th Don Cossack Regiment
29th Don Cossack Regiment
30th Don Cossack Regiment
31st Don Cossack Regiment
32nd Don Cossack Regiment    
33rd Don Cossack Regiment
34th Don Cossack Regiment
35th Don Cossack Regiment
36th Don Cossack Regiment
37th Don Cossack Regiment
38th Don Cossack Regiment
39th Don Cossack Regiment
40th Don Cossack Regiment
41st Don Cossack Regiment
42nd Don Cossack Regiment
43rd Don Cossack Regiment
44th Don Cossack Regiment
45th Don Cossack Regiment
46th Don Cossack Regiment
47th Don Cossack Regiment
48th Don Cossack Regiment
49th Don Cossack Regiment
50th Don Cossack Regiment
51st Don Cossack Regiment
52nd Don Cossack Regiment
53rd Don Cossack Regiment
54th Don Cossack Regiment
55th Don Cossack Regiment
56th Don Cossack Regiment
57th Don Cossack Regiment
58th Don Cossack Regiment
1st Combined Don Cossack Regiment
2nd Combined Don Cossack Regiment
3rd Combined Don Cossack Regiment
4th Combined Don Cossack Regiment

 
Lists of Russian and Soviet military units and formations
Cavalry regiments of the Russian Empire
Russian military units and formations of the Napoleonic Wars